Giuseppe Dante (14 March 1931 – 21 November 2018) was an Italian racing cyclist. He rode in the 1962 Tour de France.

References

External links
 

1931 births
2018 deaths
Italian male cyclists
Place of birth missing
Cyclists from the Province of Padua